Gilford Island is an island in British Columbia, Canada, located between Tribune Channel and Knight Inlet. Turnour Island is to the south across Tribune Channel, the entrance to Thompson Sound to the east.

Gilford Point at  marks the south side of the entrance to Port Elizabeth. Maple Cove, formerly Maple Bay, is on the north side of the port at

Indian reserves and other settlements
All Indian reserves on Gilford Island are under the administration of the Kwikwasut'inuxw Haxwa'mis First Nation.

There is on the island an historic indigenous community of the Kwakwaka'wakw people called Gwayasdums or Gwa'yasdams, which was destroyed by the Nuxalk in 1856 though today has been reoccupied.

Another former village, Metap, was at the head of Viner Sound on the island's northwest coast, though today there is only an Indian reserve, officially named "Meetup Indian Reserve No. 2".

Another Indian reserve on Gilford Island, Dakiulis Indian Reserve No. 7, is at the tip of Islet Point on the northwest side of the island, 0.70 ha. at 

Kyimla Indian Reserve No. 11 is on the east side of the island at Trafford Point.

Another settlement on the island is Scott Cove, at the bay of the same name on the northwest side of the island.

References

External links

Islands of British Columbia
Central Coast of British Columbia
Kwakwaka'wakw